Miegėnai (formerly) is a village in Kėdainiai district municipality, in Kaunas County, in central Lithuania. According to the 2011 census, the village has a population of 341 people. It is located 9 km from Gudžiūnai, by the Nykis river. There are library, farm cooperative, former school, former windmill and post office in Miegėnai.

History
Miegėnai (as Megene) is included to the list of devastated Lithuanian villages by Teutonic Order in 1372. During Soviet era Miegėnai was "Nemunas" kolkhoz center.

Demography

Gallery

References

Villages in Kaunas County
Kėdainiai District Municipality